André Martins de Sousa (born 26 February 1998) is a Portuguese footballer who plays for Nacional as a defensive midfielder.

Club career
On 10 September 2017, Sousa made his professional debut with Vitória Setúbal in a 2017–18 Primeira Liga match against Sporting Braga.

On 21 July 2021, he moved to Nacional on a three-year contract.

References

External links
 
 
 

1998 births
Living people
Sportspeople from Setúbal
Portuguese footballers
Portugal youth international footballers
Association football midfielders
Vitória F.C. players
C.D. Nacional players
Primeira Liga players
Liga Portugal 2 players
Campeonato de Portugal (league) players